Al Cisneros  (born September 23, 1973) is an American musician. He is the lead singer and bassist for stoner rock/doom metal bands Sleep and Om. He also was a member of Shrinebuilder and Asbestosdeath (the precursor to Sleep) and has put out nine releases as a solo artist.

Music career 
Cisneros' earliest musical interests included an appreciation of Black Sabbath, in particular their first four albums.

In 1989 he formed the sludge metal band Asbestosdeath, taking up bass and vocal duties, with Chris Hakius on drums and Matt Pike and Tom Choi on guitar.  Asbestosdeath released two EPs in 1990.

Sleep

Following Choi's departure, Cisneros, Hakius and Pike recruited Justin Marler on guitar and renamed themselves Sleep.  Cisneros jokingly called himself "Luke" in the early days of Sleep, in homage to "Luke's Wall", the title of the outro section of "War Pigs".

In 1991 Sleep released their first album, Volume One. They soon gained a devoted underground following in the doom metal scene.

In 1992 they released their next album, Sleep's Holy Mountain,  an influential album in the early development of stoner metal.

Between 1995 and 1998, Sleep worked extensively on their next album, Dopesmoker, a single song lasting one hour. However, their record label at the time refused to release it, and in 1998 Sleep disbanded. An abridged form was released in 1999 under the title Jerusalem. Dopesmoker in its entirety was first officially released by Tee Pee Records on April 22, 2003.

On November 26, 2012, it was reported that Sleep had recently announced their own status as a "full, reunited band".

Om 

In 2003, Cisneros and Hakius decided to form their own band named Om, with Cisneros on bass and vocals and Hakius on drums. As a duo, Om released the albums Variations on a Theme in 2005, Conference of the Birds in 2006, and Pilgrimage in 2007.

In January 2008, Hakius decided to leave the band and was replaced by Emil Amos on drums. Since then, Om has released the two full-length studio albums God Is Good and Advaitic Songs on the Drag City label, a 7" for Sub Pop entitled Gebel Barkal, and the live vinyl-only LP Conference Live on Important Records.

Om's 2012 tour for the Advaitic Songs album included Robert Lowe on backing vocals, guitar, synthesizer and tambura. Lowe had previously appeared on vocals and tambura on God Is Good.

Solo

In December 2012, Cisneros released his first solo record Dismas on the band's own Sinai imprint, following the religious tones themed in OM but with more of a dub approach. A second solo record Teresa of Avila followed in March 2013. A 10" EP featuring two longer songs, "Ark Procession" and "Jericho", was also released in 2013. In January 2014 a 12" EP featuring five songs was released and in October 2014 a 7" featuring two songs and artwork by David V. D'Andrea will be released by Samaritan Press. Another 7" on the Sinai imprint followed the next month under the title "Lantern of the Soul".

Discography

With Asbestos Death
1990 – Dejection
1990 – Unclean

With Sleep
1991 – Volume One
1992 – Volume Two
1992 – Sleep's Holy Mountain
1999 – Jerusalem
2003 – Dopesmoker
2014 – "The Clarity"
2018 – The Sciences
2018 – "Leagues Beneath"
2019 – "Live at Third Man Records"

With Om
2005 – Variations on a Theme
2006 – Conference of the Birds
2006 – Bedouin's Vigil (Split 7" with Six Organs of Admittance)
2006 – Inerrant Rays of Infallible Sun (Split EP with Current 93)
2007 – Pilgrimage
2008 – Live at Jerusalem
2008 – Gebel Barkal
2009 – Conference Live
2009 – God Is Good
2012 – Advaitic Songs
2014 – Live
2019 – BBC Radio 1

With Shrinebuilder
2009 – Shrinebuilder

With Melvins
2018 – Sabbath (EP)

Solo
2012 – "Dismas" 7" (Sinai) 
2013 – "Teresa of Avila" / "Levitation Dub" 7" (Sinai)
2013 – "Ark Procession"/"Jericho" 10" (Drag City)
2014 – "Toward Nazareth"/"Indica Field"/"Harvester Dub"/"Yerushaláyim"/"Version" 12" (Drag City)
2014 – "Empty Tomb"/"Sepulcher Dub" 7" (Samaritan Press)
2014 – "Lantern of the Soul"/"Untitled" 7" (Sinai)
2020 – "Apple Pipe"/"No Tobacco" 7" (Zam Zam)
2022 – Sinai Dub Box (2012-2022) (Sinai)
2022 – "Suicide Of Judas" / "Akeldama" digital single (Sinai)

Appears on
Six Organs of Admittance – River of Transfiguration. The Sun Awakens (Drag City)
Harvestman – The Hawk of Achill. In a Dark Tongue (Neurot)

Equipment
Basses
Rickenbacker 4003AC (Al Cisneros Signature model)
Rickenbacker 4420
Rickenbacker 4080/6
Rickenbacker 4003
Rickenbacker 4003S5
Rickenbacker 4004
Rickenbacker 4003W
 
Amplification
Ampeg SVT-VR
Orange Dual Dark 100
Ampeg SVT 810
Orange 2x12, 4x12
 
Effects
Peterson Strobe Tuner
Chicago Iron Tychobrahe Parachute Wah
Orange Bax Bangeetar Guitar Pre-EQ
DOD Preamp Overdrive 250 (modified)
Electro-Harmonix Pog 2
Mu-Tron Bi-Phase

References

External links

Official website of Om
Official Facebook page of Om
Official Facebook page of Sleep

Musicians from San Jose, California
Living people
1973 births
Singers from California
Guitarists from California
American male bass guitarists
Sleep (band) members
Om (band) members
Asbestosdeath members
Shrinebuilder members
21st-century American singers
21st-century American bass guitarists
21st-century American male singers
American heavy metal singers
American heavy metal bass guitarists